Černotín is a municipality and village in Přerov District in the Olomouc Region of the Czech Republic. It has about 800 inhabitants.

Administrative parts
The village of Hluzov is an administrative part of Černotín.

References

Villages in Přerov District